Howard Ellis Carr (26 December 1880 - 16 November 1960) was a British composer and conductor who also spent some of his working career in Australia. He was best known for his theatre, operetta and light orchestral genre music.

Career
Carr was born in Manchester, a nephew of the theatre composer and conductor Howard Talbot. (His mother Lillie Munkittrick was Talbot’s sister, who had married Edward Carr in 1880). Although trained as a civil engineer he began conducting at the age of 18, and secured a position as conductor at Her Majesty's Theatre, Carlisle. He became active as a conductor in London theatres between 1903 and 1906 before moving to Australia between 1907 and 1909, where he conducted light opera for the J.C. Williamson Opera Company and married Beatrice Dagmar Tracey. 

Back in England he toured as a conductor with Thomas Beecham's Opera Comique Company (alongside Hamish MacCunn), and then acted as music director and conductor at London theatres including the Adelphi, Empire, Gaiety, Lyric and Prince of Wales. One notable success was The Rebel Maid, an operetta by Montague Phillips, which Carr conducted for 114 performances from March 1921 at the Empire. Songs by Carr from some of the shows he contributed to during the 1920s were recorded on the HMV Red label. During this period he was also influential as the Secretary and Treasurer of the Musical Conductors Association.

In 1921 he became conductor of the Harrogate Municipal Orchestra, succeeding Julian Clifford after his death, sometimes programming unusual repertoire: for instance, on 21 December 1922 he conducted a performance of Lilian Elkington's tone poem Out of the Mist. This lasted until 1928, when he returned to Australia to head the New South Wales State Conservatorium in Sydney. While in Australia he continued his activities as a theatre conductor, directing a production of The Vagabond King at Her Majesty's Theatre, Sydney in October 1928. His wife died in 1929. In 1932 he succeeded Gerald Peachell as principal conductor of the Royal Philharmonic Society. In December 1932 he orchestrated and conducted the first staging of the musical Collits' Inn by Varney Monk, praised by the Sydney Morning Herald as "an Australian opera". In September 1935 the musical Love Wins Through by Adrian Ross and C. B. Fernald with music by Carr was performed by the Regal Operatic Society at the Sydney Conservatorium. 

By 1938 he was back in England, where he lived for the rest of his life, working as a freelance composer and conductor. After the war some of his music and arrangements were used, uncredited, in British films including An Ideal Husband (1947),  and The Winslow Boy (1948).  He died at the age of 79 in Kensington, London. There are photographs of Carr dated 1918 and 1921 at the National Portrait Gallery.

Music
Carr's theatre music included musical contributions and additional songs for light operettas such as A Chinese Honeymoon, The Girl for the Boy (1919), The Blue Kitten (Gaiety, December 1925), Under the Greenwood Tree,  Charles Cuvillier's The Lilac Domino (1918 London revival) and  Shanghai by Isidore Witmark and William Duncan, the latter first performed in August 1918 at the Theatre Royal, Drury Lane.  He provided incidental music for plays including The Potter Diamond and The Master Wayfarer.

His orchestral works include two symphonies (No 1 in E minor, No 2 in C major, written circa 1903-5). The manuscripts were donated to the British Library in 1962. He also composed various orchestral suites, overtures and genre pieces which were often performed at The Proms between 1917 and 1925, including The Jolly Roger (overture), The Jovial Huntsmen (rondo), The Shrine in the Wood (prelude) and The Sun God (symphonic march).

Of these the most popular was Three Heroes, a suite commemorating World War 1 heroes Michael John O'Leary, Captain Oates and Reginald Warneford, the final movement including a musical depiction of a Zeppelin air raid. This received several performances in the days immediately following the Armistice, and was played at the Proms in 1918, 1920 and 1924. The four movement ballet suite Carnival of the Elements was popular enough to be published by W Paxton & Co. Reviewing a performance at the Hastings British Music Festival in 1921, Allan Biggs described the style as "enough sensationalism, but little subtlety".

Carr also composed choral works, such as The Bush and Ode to the Deity, and staged a dramatized version of Mendelssohn's Elijah in London (1933) and in Australia (1938). Some of his songs were published by Stainer & Bell. He managed to replicate the success of Three Heroes during the Second World War with another patriotic piece - the Sir Walter Raleigh overture, premiered by the BBC Symphony Orchestra in June 1940.

References

External Links
 The Crystal Gazer by Howard Carr. Lyric Theatre Orchestra conducted by the composer (1924)

1880 births
1960 deaths
English classical composers
19th-century British composers
19th-century British male musicians
20th-century British composers
20th-century British male musicians
English male classical composers
19th-century classical composers
20th-century classical composers
English film score composers
English male film score composers
English musical theatre composers